Atelognathus patagonicus is a species of frog in the family Batrachylidae. It is endemic to the volcanic tablelands of  Neuquén Province, western Argentina. Its common name is Patagonia frog.
Its natural habitats are permanent lagoons surrounded by steppe and/or semidesert. They are mostly aquatic but can also be found in the vegetation surrounding the lagoons. Breeding takes place in water.

The population in the Laguna Blanca (in the Laguna Blanca National Park), which used to be the main subpopulation, has been extirpated by introduced by fish (perch and salmonids). However, other subpopulations, located within the buffer zone of the Laguna Blanca National Park, occur in isolated ponds and mostly appear to be stable. However, eutrophication is a problem in some ponds, and introductions of predatory fish pose a risk to all remaining subpopulations. Also disease are a risk.

References

Atelognathus
Amphibians of Patagonia
Amphibians of Argentina
Endemic fauna of Argentina
Amphibians described in 1962
Taxonomy articles created by Polbot